Destination Gotland is a Swedish ferry-line that runs state-subsidised domestic ferries from Nynäshamn and Oskarshamn to Visby on the island of Gotland. It is a wholly owned daughter company of Rederi AB Gotland. The fleet consists of four high-speed Ro-Pax ferries. The transport volumes to the island of Gotland is more than 1.4 million passengers and 640,000 lane meters of freight per year. During the high season the frequency is up to 16 departures per day to between the mainland of Sweden and the island of Gotland.

History 
Destination Gotland was founded in 1998 and has since that served the routes Visby to Nynäshamn and Oskarshamn. Originally 75% of the company was owned by Rederi AB Gotland and 25% by Silja Line. In January 1999 Silja Line sold its share in the company to Rederi AB Gotland, who from then has been the sole owner of the company. At the same time Destination Gotland changed from using Silja Lines reservations system to the BOOKIT reservations system, which is now used for all their ferry reservations and ticketing.

In the summer of 2007 Destination Gotland begun to run a service between the island of Gotland and the island of Öland. This service ceased in 2009.

In August 2021 a new ferry company, Hansa Destinations, was launched as a sister company to Destination Gotland within the Rederi AB Gotland group. The new company operates between Nynäshamn and Rostock in Germany, with some sailings stopping additionally in Visby. However, due to high fuel costs, Hansa Destinations have cancelled their services for 2023.

Fleet

Current fleet 
 
  
 
 HSC Gotlandia II (2006)

Past fleet

References

External links

 Company website
 Rederi AB Gotland, complete fleetlist (1865-)
  at Fakta om Fartyg 
 Rederi AB Gotland at Fakta om Fartyg 
Link to Guangzhou Shipyard, builders of M/S Visby and M/S Gotland

Ferry companies of Sweden
Companies based in Gotland County
Transport companies established in 1998